Patricia Monture-Angus (September 24, 1958 – November 17, 2010) was a Canadian Mohawk lawyer, activist, educator and author.

Monture-Angus graduated from Queen's University law school in May 1988, and went on to briefly study (but did not graduate) at Osgoode Hall.
In August 1988, Monture-Angus filed a suit in Ontario's Supreme Court stating that she should not be required to take an oath of allegiance to the Queen because she is a member of a sovereign nation. According to Sections 4 and 5 of the Public Officers Act, R.S.O. 1980, c. 4 15 as amended, and Rules 53 (4) and 5 1 under the Law Society Act which stated that any person appointed to any office in Ontario or called as a barrister or admitted as a solicitor must declare the following oath:

Monture-Angus argued that she was a member of a sovereign people, the Mohawk Nation, whose sovereignty has never been surrendered or extinguished. This sovereignty has been consistently recognized through treaties and historical custom, both pre-dating Confederation and continuing uninterrupted thereafter.
The case never went to court. The Law Society agreed to change its rules and make the oath optional. Monture-Angus was called to the Ontario bar in January 1994.

Monture-Angus taught law at Dalhousie University and at the University of Ottawa's Common Law School before accepting a position in the Department of Native Studies at the University of Saskatchewan in 1994. She was granted tenure in 1998 and promoted to full professor in 1999.
She married Denis Angus of the Thunderchild First Nation Cree Nation, of Treaty Six, in 1991. 
Patricia Monture-Angus died on November 17, 2010 in Saskatoon, Saskatchewan.

Publications
Thunder in my Soul: A Mohawk Woman Speaks. Fernwood Publishing, Halifax, 1995.
Journeying Forward: Dreaming First Nations' Independence. Fernwood Publishing, Halifax,  1999.
First Voices: An Aboriginal Women's Reader Monture-Angus, Patricia and Patricia Mcguire (Eds). Inanna Publications, Toronto, 2009.

References

External links
"The Challenge"
Bold Steps and New Partnerships:Proposals for University-First Nations Relations and the Return of Self-Government

Academic staff of the University of Saskatchewan
Canadian Mohawk people
Canadian women non-fiction writers
Canadian legal scholars
2010 deaths
First Nations women writers
1958 births
20th-century Canadian women writers
20th-century Canadian non-fiction writers
20th-century First Nations writers
21st-century Canadian women writers
21st-century Canadian non-fiction writers
21st-century First Nations writers
Women legal scholars
Canadian indigenous women academics
First Nations academics